Kendal is a market town in Cumbria, England.

Kendal may also refer to:

Places
Barbados
Kendal, Barbados

Canada
Kendal, Ontario
Kendal, Saskatchewan

Indonesia
Kendal Regency, a regency in Central Java Province
Kendal, Kendal, capital of Kendal Regency

Iran
Kendal, Kohgiluyeh and Boyer-Ahmad

Jamaica
Kendal, Jamaica

South Africa
Kendal Power Station

United Kingdom
Barony of Kendal, a subdivision of the historic county of Westmorland
Kendal (UK Parliament constituency) 1832–1918 parliamentary borough 
 Kendal House, an eighteenth century house 

United States
Kendal, Ohio, town absorbed into the town of Massillon in 1853

People
Kendal (surname)
Duke of Kendal
William Parr, 1st Baron Parr of Kendal (1434–1483)

Businesses
Kendals, a department store in Manchester, England, taking on the House of Fraser name in 2005
Kendal Industrial Estate, Indonesian real estate company

Other uses
Kendal (horse), a thoroughbred racehorse and sire

See also
Kendall (disambiguation)
Kendel (disambiguation)